White Hall is an unincorporated community in Prince George's County, Maryland, United States.

References

Unincorporated communities in Prince George's County, Maryland
Unincorporated communities in Maryland